Jean-Guy Brunet (born 26 April 1939) is a Canadian former alpine skier who competed in the 1960 Winter Olympics and in the 1964 Winter Olympics.

References

1939 births
Living people
Canadian male alpine skiers
Olympic alpine skiers of Canada
Alpine skiers at the 1960 Winter Olympics
Alpine skiers at the 1964 Winter Olympics